Tropical Storm Dawn was a weak tropical cyclone that caused 187 deaths in Vietnam, and was described as the worst storm to hit the region in 3 decades. The 27th tropical depression and 13th named storm of the 1998 Pacific typhoon season, Dawn formed from a monsoon trough in the South China Sea on November 16. The same day at 18:00 UTC, the Japan Meteorological Agency (JMA) assessed that it had become a tropical depression. The depression continued organizing, and on November 18 at 18:00 UTC, the Joint Typhoon Warning Center (JTWC) upgraded the depression to a tropical storm, giving it the name Dawn. Dawn peaked 1-minute sustained winds of  before making landfall near Cam Ranh, moving inland and quickly dissipating.

Dawn caused 187 fatalities in Vietnam, with heavy rains flooding hundreds of thousands of houses.

Meteorological history

The precursor to Dawn formed in a monsoon trough in the South China Sea, and on November 16, a circulation appeared near the island of Palawan, with the low becoming better organized after a northeasterly surge. The same day at 18:00 UTC, the JMA assessed that it had become a tropical depression. On the same day at 06:00 UTC, the JMA issued its first operational warning on a tropical depression, and 3 hours later at 09:00 UTC, the JTWC issued its first warning on Tropical Depression 22W as it was steered northwestwards by a subtropical ridge.

The depression continued organizing, and on the same day at 18:00 UTC, the JTWC upgraded the depression to a tropical storm, giving it the name Dawn. Dawn was a large system, with gales extending  from the center and reaching  in the western quadrants. The same day at 15:00 UTC, Dawn made landfall near Cam Ranh as a tropical storm, with considerable wind shear affecting it, with an exposed low-level circulation. Dawn moved inland and quickly dissipated over northern Cambodia, with the JTWC and the JMA assessing that it had dissipated on November 20.

Impacts
The combined effects of Dawn and cold weather from the north brought heavy rain to the provinces of Quang Binh, Khanh Hoa, and Tay Nguyen.  of rain fell in A Lưới District. A ship en route from Hong Kong to Malaysia with a crew of 22 had to abandon ship due to the storm off the coast of Phú Yên Province, with one person being killed and another 3 being injured. 432 thousand houses were flooded, with another 8 thousand collapsing. Many schools and hospitals were badly damaged, with 11 bridges and sluices being swept away. 30 thousand hectares of rice crops were waterlogged, with over 3 thousand farm animals being killed. 2 million people were displaced, and a total of 187 people were killed. Another 50 people were injured, and total losses were estimated at VND547.5 billion (USD 39.3 million). Dawn was described as being the worst storm to hit Vietnam in 30 years. The floods were later worsened by Tropical Storm Elvis, which made landfall on the same area days later.

See also
2020 Central Vietnam floods

References

Dawn
1998 in Vietnam